Nicolás Trejo Santoyo (born December 25, 1975, in Salvatierra, Guanajuato), known as Nicolás Trejo, is a Mexican football manager and former player.

External links
 

1975 births
Living people
People from Salvatierra, Guanajuato
Footballers from Guanajuato
Mexican football managers
Liga MX players
Association footballers not categorized by position
21st-century Mexican people
Mexican footballers